The 2004 Men's European Handball Championship was the sixth edition of the tournament and took place from 22 January to 1 February 2004 in Slovenia in the cities of Ljubljana, Celje, Velenje and Koper.

Venues

Qualification

1 Bold indicates champion for that year. Italic indicates host for that year.
2 as FR Yugoslavia

Preliminary round
All times are local (UTC+1).

Group A

Group B

Group C

Group D

Main round

Group I

Group II

Final round

Bracket

Semifinals

Seventh place game

Fifth place game

Third place game

Final

Ranking and statistics

Final ranking

All-Star Team

Source: EHF

Top goalscorers

Source: EHF

Top goalkeepers
(minimum 20% of total shots received by team)

Source: EHF

References

External links
The official site of the championship with reports, results, statistics, etc.
Results

E
H
European Men's Handball Championship
H
January 2004 sports events in Europe
February 2004 sports events in Europe
Sport in Velenje
Sport in Celje
Sport in Koper
Sports competitions in Ljubljana
2000s in Ljubljana